Coast & County Radio (also referred to as Coast and County Radio) is an FM community radio station, primarily serving the Yorkshire Coast. It was launched on 9 November 2016 on the MuxCo North Yorkshire DAB multiplex. DAB transmissions ceased on 1 January 2019, when the station became online only. It has studios in Scarborough and Malton.

In September 2020 it was announced that the station would start broadcasting to Scarborough on 97.4 FM, from the Oliver's Mount transmitter. The FM test broadcasts began in October 2020, with the programme service beginning on 2 November 2020.

In August 2021 plans were announced to extend coverage. With additional FM transmitters proposed for Whitby and Ravenscar. The Whitby transmitter, located at the Whitby Town F.C. ground came into service early November 2021. The switch on date for the Ravenscar transmitter has yet to be published.

Notable presenters
Ryan Swain (presenter)

External links
 
 media.info Page
 Muxco North Yorkshire

Radio stations in Yorkshire
Scarborough, North Yorkshire
Radio stations established in 2016
2016 establishments in England